The 1998 NASCAR Winston Cup Series was the 50th season of professional stock car racing in the United States and the 27th modern-era cup series. The season included 33 races and three exhibition races, beginning with the Daytona 500 at Daytona International Speedway and ending with the NAPA 500 at Atlanta Motor Speedway. Jeff Gordon won the Driver's Championship, the third of his career, and his third in the last four seasons.

Teams and drivers

Complete schedule

Limited schedule

Schedule

Races

Bud Shootout Qualifier 

The Bud Shootout Qualifier, a race for the fastest second round qualifier, from each race from the previous season, was run on February 8 in Daytona Beach, Florida. Sterling Marlin drew the pole. The race was broadcast on ESPN.

Top Ten Results

23- Jimmy Spencer
9- Lake Speed
3- Dale Earnhardt
40- Sterling Marlin
11- Brett Bodine
97- Chad Little
75- Rick Mast
29- Jeff Green
98- Greg Sacks
17- Darrell Waltrip

Bud Shootout 

The Bud Shootout, a race for pole winners from the previous season, was run on February 8 in Daytona Beach, Florida. Mark Martin drew the pole. The race was broadcast on CBS.

Top Ten Results

2- Rusty Wallace
81- Kenny Wallace
94- Bill Elliott
23- Jimmy Spencer
33- Ken Schrader
7- Geoff Bodine
36- Ernie Irvan
6- Mark Martin
43- John Andretti
35- Todd Bodine

Gatorade 125s 

Race One: Top Ten Results

The Gatorade Twin 125s were run on February 12 in Daytona Beach, Florida. Bobby and Terry Labonte were the pole-sitters, for both races, respectively. The races were broadcast tape delayed on CBS prior to the Daytona 500.

 40-Sterling Marlin
 88-Dale Jarrett
 18-Bobby Labonte
 23-Jimmy Spencer
 22-Ward Burton
 30-Derrike Cope
 12-Jeremy Mayfield
 6-Mark Martin
 43-John Andretti
 94-Bill Elliott

Ken Schrader was injured in a crash on the last lap of Race 1.  The No. 96 Chevrolet of David Green got into the rear of Schrader's No. 33 Chevrolet in Turn 1.  It put Schrader head-on into the wall.  Schrader's car also caught Johnny Benson in the No. 26 Ford and put Benson in the wall, eliminating his chance to make the Daytona 500.  In the crash, Schrader suffered a broken sternum.  He raced in the 500 using his car from the Bud Shootout (it was painted differently from the car Schrader was intending to use in the 500) while wearing a bull rider's vest.

Race Two: Top Ten Results

 3-Dale Earnhardt
 21-Michael Waltrip
 31-Mike Skinner
 36-Ernie Irvan
 2-Rusty Wallace
 99-Jeff Burton
 9-Lake Speed
 95-Andy Hillenburg
 91-Kevin Lepage
 4-Bobby Hamilton

40th Daytona 500 

The Daytona 500 was run on February 15 in Daytona Beach, Florida. The Labonte brothers shared the front row with Bobby Labonte on the pole, and brother Terry Labonte starting second. But the biggest news of the day was Dale Earnhardt's long-awaited victory in the Daytona 500 after 19 frustrating attempts to win the big race. Moreover, his victory snapped a 59-race winless streak dating back to the spring of 1996. The race was broadcast on CBS. Dale dedicated the win to his late friend and colleague, Neil Bonnett, who died after a crash while practicing for the 1994 race.

Top Ten Results
 3-Dale Earnhardt
 18-Bobby Labonte
 12-Jeremy Mayfield
 33-Ken Schrader
 2-Rusty Wallace
 36-Ernie Irvan
 97-Chad Little
 31-Mike Skinner
 21-Michael Waltrip
 94-Bill Elliott

Failed to qualify: 07-Dan Pardus, 8-Hut Stricklin, 14-Loy Allen Jr., 26-Johnny Benson, 29-Jeff Green, 35-Todd Bodine, 46-Wally Dallenbach Jr., 59-Mark Gibson, 78-Gary Bradberry, 79-Norm Benning, 80-Michael Ciochetti, 81-Kenny Wallace, 85-Randy Renfrow, 96-David Green

"20 years of trying, 20 years of frustration. Dale Earnhardt will come to the caution flag to win the Daytona 500! Finally!" - Mike Joy talking as Earnhardt came to the white flag and the caution flag, giving him his first (and only) Daytona 500 victory.

GM Goodwrench Service Plus 400 

The GM Goodwrench Service Plus 400 was run on February 22 in Rockingham, North Carolina. The No. 75 of Rick Mast won the pole. The race was broadcast on TNN.

Top Ten Results

 24-Jeff Gordon
 2-Rusty Wallace
 6-Mark Martin
 23-Jimmy Spencer
 7-Geoff Bodine
 94-Bill Elliott
 88-Dale Jarrett
 5-Terry Labonte
 4-Bobby Hamilton
 50-Ricky Craven

Failed to qualify: 05-Morgan Shepherd, 35-Todd Bodine, 46-Wally Dallenbach Jr., 71-Dave Marcis, 78-Gary Bradberry, 91-Kevin Lepage

Las Vegas 400 

The inaugural Las Vegas 400 was run on March 1 at Las Vegas Motor Speedway in Las Vegas, Nevada. The No. 88 of Dale Jarrett won the pole. The race was broadcast on ABC.

Top Ten Results

 6-Mark Martin
 99-Jeff Burton
 2-Rusty Wallace
 26-Johnny Benson
 12-Jeremy Mayfield
 16-Ted Musgrave
 23-Jimmy Spencer
 3-Dale Earnhardt
 94-Bill Elliott
 97-Chad Little

Failed to qualify: 1-Steve Park, 13-Jerry Nadeau, 19-Tony Raines, 35-Todd Bodine, 37-Larry Gunselman, 38-Butch Gilliland, 71-Dave Marcis, 78-Gary Bradberry

Mark Martin's win in this inaugural Las Vegas 400 was the first for the Ford Taurus.
Dale Earnhardt, finishing 8th, would be the only driver to finish in the Top 10 that was not driving a Ford Taurus.

Primestar 500 

The Primestar 500 was scheduled to run on March 8 at Atlanta Motor Speedway in Hampton, Georgia, but was run on March 9 due to rain. The No. 43 of John Andretti won the pole. Steve Park suffered a broken leg in a crash during a Saturday morning practice session before 2nd Round Qualifying.  Park's car hit the wall coming off Turn 4, hit it again in the quad-oval, then shot across the grass and hit the pit wall, scattering equipment on the wall (air guns, lugnuts, etc.) around.  This crash put Park out of the No. 1 until Indianapolis in August.  Phil Parsons was tapped to replace Park on a temporary basis, with Darrell Waltrip being chosen to fill in soon after. The race was supposed to be broadcast on ABC, but due to the washout, the broadcast was moved to ESPN.

Top Ten Results

 18-Bobby Labonte
 88-Dale Jarrett
 12-Jeremy Mayfield
 2-Rusty Wallace
 28-Kenny Irwin Jr.
 90-Dick Trickle
 81-Kenny Wallace
 99-Jeff Burton
 26-Johnny Benson
 35-Todd Bodine

Failed to qualify: 05-Morgan Shepherd, 1-Steve Park/Phil Parsons, 29-Jeff Green, 40-Sterling Marlin*, 71-Dave Marcis, 95-Andy Hillenburg, 97-Chad Little

After Sterling Marlin unexpectedly failed to qualify, Coors Light decals were placed on the No. 91 of Kevin Lepage for the race.

TranSouth Financial 400 

The TranSouth Financial 400 was run on March 22 in Darlington, South Carolina. Mark Martin won the pole.  Before this race, Ricky Craven was diagnosed with post-concussion syndrome.  Because of this, he was forced to sit out.  2 time defending Busch Grand National champion Randy LaJoie was tapped to sub for Craven in the No. 50 Chevrolet.  LaJoie ended up finishing 38th, 9 laps down as he encountered problems during the race. The race was broadcast on ESPN.

Top Ten Results

 88-Dale Jarrett
 24-Jeff Gordon
 2-Rusty Wallace
 12-Jeremy Mayfield
 99-Jeff Burton
 5-Terry Labonte
 6-Mark Martin
 26-Johnny Benson
 81-Kenny Wallace
 16-Ted Musgrave

Darrell Waltrip showed up to the track with a special No. 300 car as a tribute to Tim Flock, who was dying from cancer. The car was named "Tim Flock Special" and was based on Flock's car from 1955. Due to NASCAR prohibiting three digit numbers from competing, Waltrip used his familiar No. 17. Not only was this the final race Waltrip would be in the No. 17, but this would also be his final race as a Winston Cup owner/driver. The No. 17 would later return for Roush Racing.
Failed to qualify: 05-Morgan Shepherd, 1-Ron Hornaday Jr., 8-Hut Stricklin, 46-Wally Dallenbach Jr., 71-Dave Marcis, 78-Gary Bradberry

Food City 500 

The Food City 500 was run on March 29 at Bristol Motor Speedway in Bristol, Tennessee.  The No. 2 of Rusty Wallace won the pole. The race was broadcast on ESPN.

Top Ten Results

 24-Jeff Gordon
 5-Terry Labonte
 88-Dale Jarrett
 99-Jeff Burton
 26-Johnny Benson
 33-Ken Schrader
 6-Mark Martin
 16-Ted Musgrave
 21-Michael Waltrip
 50-Randy LaJoie

Failed to qualify: 29-Jeff Green, 42-Joe Nemechek, 71-Dave Marcis, 78-Gary Bradberry

Texas 500 

The Texas 500 was run on April 5 in Fort Worth, Texas. The No. 12 of Jeremy Mayfield won the pole. During this race, journeyman Greg Sacks suffered near-fatal injuries in a lap 137 crash. Replays showed that the car got loose in the corner.  Sacks over-corrected, which resulted in the car hitting the wall at about a 50 degree angle.  Sacks suffered head injuries and had to be cut out of his No. 98 Ford.  He would sit out the remainder of the 1998 season.  After this crash, Sacks only raced sparingly in the ARCA Racing Series, the Cup Series, and the Xfinity Series. The race was broadcast on CBS.

Top Ten Results

 6-Mark Martin
 97-Chad Little
 77-Robert Pressley
 42-Joe Nemechek
 26-Johnny Benson
 5-Terry Labonte
 23-Jimmy Spencer
 18-Bobby Labonte
 21-Michael Waltrip
 41-Steve Grissom

Failed to qualify:
13-Jerry Nadeau, 30-Derrike Cope, 35-Todd Bodine, 47-Billy Standridge, 95-Andy Hillenburg

The green flag was waved by Jim Roper, who won the very first NASCAR Strictly Stock race in 1949.
On lap 2, there was a multi-car pileup in turn 1 that involved at least 9 cars, including Dale Earnhardt, Ted Musgrave, Darrell Waltrip, John Andretti, Rick Mast, Kenny Wallace, Kevin Lepage, Hut Stricklin and Jeff Gordon. Andretti's car caught fire when his fuel pump broke. This was very similar to the start of the previous year's race.
Mike Skinner was injured in a hard crash into the wall on lap 252 in the quad-oval.  He had actually already been injured at Atlanta earlier in the season in another hard crash, but was hurt enough here that he had to sit out 3 races.  Morgan Shepherd, who had relief driven for Skinner at Darlington a couple weeks earlier, drove the car the next 2 races (Martinsville and Talladega), where he finished 11th and 35th (after getting caught up in "The Big One").  Mike Dillon, car owner Richard Childress' son-in-law, drove the car at California to a 35th-place finish.

Goody's Headache Powder 500 (Martinsville) 

The Goody's Headache Powder 500 was scheduled to run on April 19 in Martinsville, Virginia, but was run on April 20 due to rain. Bobby Hamilton won the pole. The race was broadcast on ESPN.

Top Ten Results

 4-Bobby Hamilton
 16-Ted Musgrave
 88-Dale Jarrett
 3-Dale Earnhardt
 50-Randy LaJoie
 2-Rusty Wallace
 12-Jeremy Mayfield
 24-Jeff Gordon
 36-Ernie Irvan
 33-Ken Schrader

Failed to qualify: 46-Wally Dallenbach Jr., 71-Dave Marcis, 78-Gary Bradberry

 Bobby Hamilton led 378 of the race's 500 laps on his way to a dominant victory, it was his penultimate Cup series victory.
Rich Bickle was tapped to drive the No. 98 Ford in place of the injured Greg Sacks for the rest of the season.  Here, Bickle qualified 11th, but ran into problems and finished 41st.
 Last win for Morgan McClure Motorsports.
Randy LaJoie's fifth-place finish stands as his lone top five in the Cup Series.

DieHard 500 

The DieHard 500 was run on April 26 in Talladega, Alabama. Bobby Labonte won the pole and went on to win the race. The race was marred by "The Big One" on lap 141, collecting Dale Earnhardt, Bill Elliott and 18 other cars. The race was broadcast on ABC.

Top Ten Results

 18-Bobby Labonte
 23-Jimmy Spencer
 88-Dale Jarrett
 5-Terry Labonte
 24-Jeff Gordon
 36-Ernie Irvan
 81-Kenny Wallace
 22-Ward Burton
 40-Sterling Marlin
 50-Randy LaJoie

Failed to qualify: 07-Dan Pardus, 7-Geoff Bodine, 8-Hut Stricklin, 29-Jeff Green, 35-Todd Bodine, 60-Matt Kenseth, 61-Bob Strait, 78-Gary Bradberry, 98-Rich Bickle

The No. 60 Ford was a 6th Roush Racing Ford that was entered for Matt Kenseth.
This was the only DNQ of Matt Kenseth's Cup Series career.
After Geoff Bodine failed to qualify, Billy Standridge received sponsorship from Philips.
Bobby Labonte's victory made him the first Pontiac driver to win multiple races since Rusty Wallace in 1993.

California 500 presented by NAPA 

The California 500 was run on May 3 in Fontana, California. Jeff Gordon won the pole. For the second week in a row, a multiple car crash involved Bill Elliott's car erupting in flames. The race was broadcast on ESPN.

Top Ten Results

 6-Mark Martin
 12-Jeremy Mayfield
 5-Terry Labonte
 24-Jeff Gordon
 1-Darrell Waltrip
 97-Chad Little
 7-Geoff Bodine
 26-Johnny Benson
 3-Dale Earnhardt
 99-Jeff Burton

Failed to qualify: 8-Hut Stricklin, 19-Tony Raines, 71-Dave Marcis, 98-Rich Bickle

Final career top 5 finish for Darrell Waltrip.
Only career race that Mike Dillon started, driving the #31 for father-in-law Richard Childress. The only other Cup Series race Dillon - father of future Cup Series drivers Austin and Ty Dillon - participated in was the previous year's Southern 500 as a relief driver for Dale Earnhardt after Earnhardt blacked out for unknown reasons early in that race.

The Winston 

The Winston, a non-points race with seventy laps in three segments, was run on May 16 in Concord, North Carolina at Charlotte Motor Speedway. Bill Elliott won the pole in the #94. The No. 6 of Mark Martin won after the No. 24 of Jeff Gordon ran out of gas on the last lap after dominating all night. The race was broadcast on TNN.

Top Ten Results

 6-Mark Martin
 18-Bobby Labonte
 88-Dale Jarrett
 99-Jeff Burton
 2-Rusty Wallace
 40-Sterling Marlin
 94-Bill Elliott
 7-Geoff Bodine
 4-Bobby Hamilton
 98-Rich Bickle

Coca-Cola 600 

The Coca-Cola 600 was run on May 24 in Concord, North Carolina. Jeff Gordon won the pole. The race was broadcast on TBS.

Top Ten Results

 24-Jeff Gordon
 2-Rusty Wallace
 18-Bobby Labonte
 6-Mark Martin
 88-Dale Jarrett
 42-Joe Nemechek
 43-John Andretti
 99-Jeff Burton
 26-Johnny Benson
 33-Ken Schrader

Failed to qualify: 07-Dan Pardus, 8-Hut Stricklin, 28-Kenny Irwin Jr., 46-Morgan Shepherd, 47-Billy Standridge, 71-Dave Marcis, 85-Randy MacDonald, 95-Andy Hillenburg

 Bill Elliott had Jeff Green relieve him midway through the race after his hard accidents at Talladega and California.
After Morgan Shepherd failed to qualify for the race, First Union put their colors on the No. 91 LJ Racing Chevrolet driven by Kevin Lepage, who had qualified 15th.  Lepage ran into problems early and finished 36th.
This was the 1st career Winston Cup start for Elliott Sadler, who drove the No. 92 Chevrolet for Diamond Ridge Motorsports (Sadler's Busch Grand National team at the time).  Sadler blew an engine and finished 42nd after starting 31st.

MBNA Platinum 400 

The MBNA Platinum 400 was run on May 31 in Dover, Delaware. The No. 2 of Rusty Wallace won the pole. The race was broadcast on TNN.

Top Ten Results

 88-Dale Jarrett
 99-Jeff Burton
 24-Jeff Gordon
 18-Bobby Labonte
 12-Jeremy Mayfield
 10-Ricky Rudd
 6-Mark Martin
 8-Buckshot Jones*
 36-Ernie Irvan
 5-Terry Labonte

Failed to qualify: 13-Dennis Setzer, 35-Todd Bodine, 46-Morgan Shepherd

This was Buckshot Jones' only career Top 10 finish in the Winston Cup Series, in only his 2nd career start.

Pontiac Excitement 400 

The Pontiac Excitement 400 was run on June 6 in Richmond, Virginia. Jeff Gordon won the pole. The race was broadcast on ESPN.

Top Ten Results

 5-Terry Labonte
 88-Dale Jarrett
 2-Rusty Wallace
 33-Ken Schrader
 6-Mark Martin
 12-Jeremy Mayfield
 99-Jeff Burton
 18-Bobby Labonte
 28-Kenny Irwin Jr.
 40-Sterling Marlin

Failed to qualify: 8-Buckshot Jones, 91-Kevin Lepage

On lap 370, Jeff Gordon was battling for the lead with Rusty Wallace. Gordon passed Wallace off turn 4 to take the lead, but was tapped by Wallace and spun into the outside wall in turn 2, suffering major damage on the front. Many fans cheered as Gordon's car was pushed toward the garage area. Gordon finished 37th, experiencing his 2nd DNF of 1998.
This would be Jeff Gordon's final finish outside the top 10 in 1998, because after this race, he would spend the next/last 20 races in the top 10. He would go on to score 17 consecutive top 5 finishes and 20 consecutive top 10 finishes, which both stand as All-Time NASCAR records as of 2021. He would go on to score 10 victories in the 20 race stretch.
This race was notable as it was the first time that NASCAR decided to red flag a race with under 10 laps to go in order to ensure a green flag finish.  This did allow for a final restart, but the race still ended under caution when the No. 26 of Johnny Benson smacked the wall in Turn 1 with 2 laps to go.  Benson scraped along the wall for the rest of the race to finish 18th.
This was the first time that the first race of the season at Richmond was held at night during the spring. In previous years, it was an afternoon race in February or March.
This Was Dale Earnhardts final race with Larry McReynolds as his crew chief after 45 races together and 1 win, Team Owner Richard Childress swapped McReynolds with Mike Skinners Crew Chief Kevin Hamlin, Both drivers saw better performances after swapping

Miller Lite 400 

The Miller Lite 400 was run on June 14 in Brooklyn, Michigan. Ward Burton won the pole. The race was broadcast on CBS.

Top Ten Results

 6-Mark Martin
 88-Dale Jarrett
 24-Jeff Gordon
 99-Jeff Burton
 12-Jeremy Mayfield
 94-Bill Elliott
 18-Bobby Labonte
 22-Ward Burton
 42-Joe Nemechek
 50-Wally Dallenbach Jr.*

Failed to qualify: 19-Tony Raines, 30-Derrike Cope, 35-Todd Bodine, 71-Dave Marcis

This race would begin Jeff Gordon's stretch of 17 consecutive top 5 finishes, and 20 consecutive top 10 finishes, which both stand as All-Time NASCAR records as of 2021.
Wally Dallenbach Jr. drove the No. 50 Chevrolet in place of Randy LaJoie, who had Busch Grand National obligations at Pikes Peak International Raceway in his No. 74 Chevrolet.

Pocono 500 

The Pocono 500 was run on June 21 in Long Pond, Pennsylvania. Jeff Gordon won the pole. The race was broadcast on TNN.

Top Ten Results

 12-Jeremy Mayfield*
 24-Jeff Gordon
 88-Dale Jarrett
 99-Jeff Burton
 6-Mark Martin
 1-Darrell Waltrip
 50-Wally Dallenbach Jr.
 3-Dale Earnhardt
 40-Sterling Marlin
 23-Jimmy Spencer

Failed to qualify: 00-Buckshot Jones, 71-Dave Marcis

This was Jeremy Mayfield's 1st career Winston Cup victory.  In order to procure the victory, Mayfield had to overtake the No. 1 Chevrolet of Darrell Waltrip, Mayfield's idol.
Final career top 10 finish for Darrell Waltrip.
The race was interrupted by a 71-minute red flag for rain.
Final race for Todd Bodine as ISM Racing's driver; as following his failure to qualify for the 1998 Save Mart/Kragen 350 - the 8th race that ISM Racing failed to qualify for - and with only one Top 10 finish at the Primestar 500 in Atlanta; Bodine was released by the team.

Save Mart/Kragen 350 

The Save Mart/Kragen 350 was run on June 28 in Sonoma, California. Jeff Gordon won the pole. The race was broadcast on ESPN.

Top Ten Results

 24-Jeff Gordon
 4-Bobby Hamilton
 43-John Andretti
 18-Bobby Labonte
 2-Rusty Wallace
 6-Mark Martin
 40-Sterling Marlin
 75-Rick Mast*
 28-Kenny Irwin Jr.
 41-Steve Grissom

Failed to qualify: 35-Todd Bodine, 46-Tommy Kendall*, 58-Chris Raudman, 70-Rick Ware, 71-Dave Marcis

During the weekend, Kevin Lepage signed a contract with Roush Racing to replace Ted Musgrave in the No. 16 Ford after The Bud at The Glen.  After learning of the deal, Lepage was dropped by LJ Racing after 2nd round qualifying.  The car still made the field in 42nd starting spot through a provisional.  Tommy Kendall was tapped to drive the car in the race and drove up from the back of the field to finish 16th.
To try to get Rick Mast some confidence coming into Sears Point, the Butch Mock Racing team gave Rick the nickname "Nigel Mast," after the former Formula One World Champion Nigel Mansell. It was designed to convince Rick that he could run well at road courses, typically the scenes of mediocre finishes, DNF's, and most notably, a spectacular wreck at Watkins Glen in 1993.  Previously, his best road course finish was 11th at Sears Point in 1992.
Jerry Nadeau got anxious on the start, having never been so close to the front previously in his Winston Cup career.  Starting on the outside pole, Nadeau tried to beat polesitter Jeff Gordon to Turn 2 (the first right turn on the course).  Unfortunately, he went into Turn 1 too fast and drove off course.  By the time he had fully recovered the car, he had dropped to 5th.  The off course excursion caused problems with Nadeau's brakes and tires to develop, which resulted in Nadeau crashing in the esses on lap 15, which put him out of the race with a 43rd (last) place finish.
This resulted in a 10 lap full course caution because the impact of Burton's car caused damage to the wall.
Lake Speed suffered rib and sternum injuries in a practice crash in Turn 10.  The injuries were serious enough for Speed to have to sit out the race. Winston West regular Butch Gilliland drove the No. 9 Ford to a 24th-place finish from 40th on the grid in place of Speed.
Jeff Gordon would take over the Winston Cup point lead after Jeremy Mayfield had troubles in this race.  Gordon held on to the lead for the rest of the year.
This was the first race with the configuration erasing turns 4–6. A short chute was in place where the old hills were, making speeds much faster on the speed charts.
At the time this race was held no driver who had won at Sears Point went on to win the championship. Race winner Jeff Gordon was the first to win both Sears Point and the championship later that year, earning his 3rd championship in 4 years.

Jiffy Lube 300 

The Jiffy Lube 300 was run on July 12 in Loudon, New Hampshire. The No. 50 of Ricky Craven won the pole in his return to the No. 50 after missing the previous 13 races. This race was the last career start for Lake Speed, whose aggravated rib and sternum injuries during the race led to his retirement. Speed's original injuries came from a practice crash he suffered in the previous race at Sears Point. The race was broadcast on TNN.

Top Ten Results

 99-Jeff Burton
 6-Mark Martin
 24-Jeff Gordon
 2-Rusty Wallace
 31-Mike Skinner
 43-John Andretti
 88-Dale Jarrett
 44-Kyle Petty
 33-Ken Schrader
 81-Kenny Wallace

Failed to qualify: 71-Dave Marcis

Pennsylvania 500 

The Pennsylvania 500 was run on July 26 in Long Pond, Pennsylvania. The No. 22 of Ward Burton won the pole. The race was broadcast on TBS.

Top Ten Results

 24-Jeff Gordon
 6-Mark Martin
 99-Jeff Burton
 18-Bobby Labonte
 88-Dale Jarrett
 2-Rusty Wallace
 3-Dale Earnhardt
 33-Ken Schrader
 36-Ernie Irvan
 21-Michael Waltrip

Failed to qualify: 35-Jimmy Horton, 78-Gary Bradberry, 79-Randy MacDonald

After the previous Sunday's race at Loudon, Jerry Nadeau was fired out of the No. 13 Ford. He immediately signed with Melling Racing to race their No. 9 Ford after Lake Speed was forced to retire because of his injuries. Nadeau finished 26th, 2 laps down in his first race at Melling after starting 34th.
Elliott-Marino Racing tapped Wally Dallenbach Jr. to drive the No. 13 Ford on an interim basis starting at Pocono. Dallenbach finished 25th, 2 laps down. after starting 42nd (with a provisional)
Morgan Shepherd was tapped to drive the No. 91 LJ Racing Chevrolet starting at Pocono. Shepherd qualified a strong 7th, but collided with the turn 1 wall on lap 71 and finished 40th.

Brickyard 400 

The Brickyard 400 was run on August 1 in Speedway, Indiana. Ernie Irvan won the pole. The race was broadcast on ABC.

Top Ten Results

 24-Jeff Gordon
 6-Mark Martin
 18-Bobby Labonte
 31-Mike Skinner
 3-Dale Earnhardt
 36-Ernie Irvan
 43-John Andretti
 2-Rusty Wallace
 5-Terry Labonte
 33-Ken Schrader

Failed to qualify: 07-Dan Pardus, 14-Lance Hooper*, 15-Loy Allen Jr., 19-Robby Gordon, 30-Derrike Cope, 78-Gary Bradberry, 95-Randy MacDonald, 96-Hut Stricklin

Jimmy Spencer suffered a concussion in a crash late in the race in Turn 2. This forced Spencer to seek relief from Boris Said the next weekend at Watkins Glen. Spencer, not fully recovered from his concussion at Indy, had to completely sit out the following two races at Michigan with driver Frank Kimmel and Bristol with Ted Musgrave filling in respectively.
Jeremy Mayfield crashed early in the race coming out of Turn 1.  He seemed fine after the wreck, but at Watkins Glen the next weekend, he suffered fainting spells and had Larry Gunselman on standby, but did not take relief during the race.
On lap 77, Ward Burton cut a tire and hit the wall in turn 2, but the race stayed green for the next several laps. As Burton's car came to a stop on the warmup lane inside turn 3, drivers proceeded to make pit stops under green. With the caution still not yet out, leader Dale Jarrett began running out of gas exiting turn 1. After limping slowly around into the pits, Jarrett came to a stop just past the pit lane entrance. Jarrett's crew ran quickly toward the entrance of pit road to retrieve the car. After pushing the car about 1000 feet to the pit box, the team managed to refuel it and change four tires. The misadventure cost Jarrett 4 laps, but he would eventually finish in 16th place, last car on the lead lap.
This was the last race attempted by Precision Products Racing, as car owner Richard Jackson withdrew the #14 car driven by Lance Hooper before qualifying began due to lack of sponsorship, when their one race sponsorship deal with World Championship Wrestling began to fallout days earlier, and also Jackson planning on continuing focusing on his Busch Grand National team during the rest of the 1998 Season.
The race also marked the return of Steve Park to Winston Cup action for the first time since suffering injuries in a practice crash in March at Atlanta.
 Jeff Gordon had become the first driver to win the Brickyard 400 twice, and he won the No Bull 5 Million Dollar Bonus. Mark Martin and Bobby Labonte, finishing 2nd and 3rd respectively, were also No Bull 5 contenders. Dale Jarrett and Rusty Wallace were the other two contenders for the bonus.
 This race ended under the caution flag, as due to a multi-car accident with a couple laps to go, there were not enough laps to clean up the track and restart the race.

The Bud at The Glen 

The Bud at The Glen was run on August 9 at Watkins Glen International in Watkins Glen, New York. Jeff Gordon won the pole. The race was broadcast on ESPN.

Top Ten Results

 24-Jeff Gordon
 6-Mark Martin*
 31-Mike Skinner*
 2-Rusty Wallace
 88-Dale Jarrett
 44-Kyle Petty
 40-Sterling Marlin
 43-John Andretti
 26-Johnny Benson
 18-Bobby Labonte

Failed to qualify: 58-Larry Gunselman**, 59-Brian Cunningham, 71-Dave Marcis

Jeff Gordon did not actually know during the chase down of Mike Skinner that he was not actually leading the race until there were about 9 or 10 laps to go, when Crew Chief Ray Evernham radioed to him, pointed out Skinner in front of him, told him he was the leader and to go get him.
On the ESPN telecast, it was stated that Rick Wilson attempted the race in the No. 58 instead of Larry Gunselman.
Gunselman was also tapped to stand by to potentially drive in relief of Jeremy Mayfield, but did not get in the No. 12 during the race.
Jimmy Spencer was forced to give way to Boris Said at the first full course caution because of the concussion that he had suffered the previous Saturday during the Brickyard 400.  Spencer only briefly practiced the car before the race.  Said had practiced and qualified the car in the 5th position (Since Spencer started the car that Said had qualified, Spencer had to start at the rear of the field).  After Said got in the car at lap 10, he began a drive up through the field.  A couple of spins within 10 laps of each other slowed Said's charge on his way to a 20th-place finish.
Dick Trickle was relieved during the race by Busch North and Featherlite Modified driver Ted Christopher.  According to the ESPN telecast, this was because of Trickle's apparent lack of skill and confidence in his road racing abilities.  Christopher ran very well in the race before the engine blew late in the race, leaving Trickle (who got the drivers' points because he started the race) with a 41st-place finish.
Tom Hubert was hired by Elliott-Marino Racing to drive the No. 13 Ford.  Hubert qualified 20th and drove up to 11th before having a slight off-course excursion.  The big hit came on the restart after the 2nd caution when the No. 33 of Ken Schrader ran up on the left rear of Hubert.  This peeled a good chunk of the left side sheetmetal off the car and spun it out.  The No. 23 and the No. 12 of Jeremy Mayfield also spun in this incident.  Mayfield got stuck in the gravel, prompting the third full course caution of the race.
Mike Skinner had his best career finish (in this case, 3rd) for the second consecutive week.  This finish was achieved through a pit strategy that resulted in him attempting to go all the way on fuel from the last full course caution, a distance of 39 laps (95.55 miles).  After all the leaders had pitted, Skinner had a 25-second lead over Jeff Gordon.  Skinner had to conserve fuel in order to make the finish, so he drove much slower than he would have.  Gordon, along with Mark Martin and Rusty Wallace ran Skinner down with 3 laps to go.  Gordon and Martin were able to pass Skinner, but Wallace was not able to.
This race was the 4th consecutive race that Mark Martin finished 2nd, and 3rd straight 2nd-place finish to winner Jeff Gordon, losing 30 points to him in the standings over the 3 races.
This was the last Cup race sponsored by a beer company.
Ron Fellows was the first road ringer to qualify on the front row since Dan Gurney in 1970 at Riverside Raceway. In honor of his achievement, as well as the Canadian fans who watched the race, NASCAR, during pre-race ceremonies, had a singer recite the Canadian National Anthem along with the Star-Spangled Banner.
This race was held the day after Mark Martin's father, stepmother and half-sister were killed in a plane crash in Nevada.

Pepsi 400 presented by DeVilbiss 

The Pepsi 400 presented by DeVilbiss was run on August 16 in Brooklyn, Michigan. Ernie Irvan won the pole. The race was broadcast on ESPN.

Top Ten Results

 24-Jeff Gordon*
 18-Bobby Labonte
 88-Dale Jarrett
 6-Mark Martin
 99-Jeff Burton
 36-Ernie Irvan
 12-Jeremy Mayfield
 50-Wally Dallenbach Jr.*
 43-John Andretti
 97-Chad Little

Failed to qualify: 71-Dave Marcis, 78-Gary Bradberry, 81-Kenny Wallace, 96-Hut Stricklin

Wally Dallenbach Jr. was hired to drive the No. 50 Chevrolet for the rest of the season, and all of 1999 at this point.
This was Jeff Gordon's 4th consecutive victory, tying the Modern-era record for most consecutive victories. He would become the 7th driver to do so (joining Cale Yarborough in 1976, Darrell Waltrip in 1981, Dale Earnhardt in 1987, Harry Gant in 1991, Bill Elliott in 1992, and Mark Martin in 1993). Future teammate Jimmie Johnson would join the group in 2007. After Johnson in 2007, it has not been done since.

Goody's Headache Powder 500 (Bristol) 

The Goody's Headache Powder 500 was run on August 22 in Bristol, Tennessee. Rusty Wallace won the pole. The race was broadcast on ESPN.

Top Ten Results

 6-Mark Martin
 99-Jeff Burton
 2-Rusty Wallace
 88-Dale Jarrett
 24-Jeff Gordon
 3-Dale Earnhardt
 31-Mike Skinner
 12-Jeremy Mayfield
 10-Ricky Rudd
 16-Kevin Lepage

Failed to qualify: 41-Steve Grissom, 71-Dave Marcis, 78-Gary Bradberry, 85-Ken Bouchard

Mark Martin prevented Jeff Gordon from scoring the elusive 5th straight win, a feat that has never been done in NASCAR's modern era. 
Ted Musgrave subbed for Jimmy Spencer in the No. 23 Ford for Travis Carter Enterprises. Spencer was still recovering from the concussion that he suffered at the Brickyard 400.

Farm Aid on CMT 300 

The Farm Aid on CMT 300 was run on August 30 in Loudon, New Hampshire. Jeff Gordon won the pole. The race was broadcast on TNN.

Top Ten Results

 24-Jeff Gordon*
  6-Mark Martin
 43-John Andretti
 88-Dale Jarrett
 99-Jeff Burton
 81-Kenny Wallace
 18-Bobby Labonte
  2-Rusty Wallace
  3-Dale Earnhardt
 10-Ricky Rudd

Failed to qualify: 00-Buckshot Jones, 07-Dan Pardus, 30-Derrike Cope, 79-Ken Bouchard

This race marked the beginning of "Tiregate." Jeff Gordon won both Michigan on August 16 and New Hampshire on August 30 after making a two-tire final pit stop and pulling away from the pack. Jack Roush, owner of the 6, 16, 26, 97, and 99 cars driven by Mark Martin, Ted Musgrave/Kevin Lepage, Johnny Benson, Chad Little, and Jeff Burton, respectively, accused Gordon and his team of cheating by applying chemical solvents to their tires. NASCAR officials began an investigation by sealing off Gordon's pit stall and confiscating several sets of tires for testing. Gordon and his team were later acquitted of any wrongdoing prior to the start of the Exide NASCAR Select Batteries 400 at Richmond.
American Equipment Racing owned by Buz McCall, surprised the racing world by bringing road racer Ron Fellows to drive the #96 CAT car at an oval track rather than a road course. It was Ron Fellows' only Winston Cup start on an oval track. Ron Fellows would qualify 42nd in the #96 CAT car, and finish a heartbreaking 36th-place finish.

Pepsi Southern 500 

The Pepsi Southern 500 was run on September 6 in Darlington, South Carolina. Dale Jarrett won the pole. The race was broadcast on ESPN.

Top Ten Results

 24-Jeff Gordon
 99-Jeff Burton
 88-Dale Jarrett
  3-Dale Earnhardt
 12-Jeremy Mayfield 1 lap down
 36-Ernie Irvan 2 laps down
  2-Rusty Wallace 2 laps down
 40-Sterling Marlin 2 laps down
  7-Geoff Bodine 3 laps down
 81-Kenny Wallace 3 laps down

Failed to qualify: 71-Dave Marcis, 91-Morgan Shepherd, 96-Hut Stricklin

This race was part of the Winston No Bull 5 program.  Jeff Gordon won the last such race, making him eligible to win a million dollars in this race if he pulled off a win.
This was Jeff Gordon's 7th win in the last 9 races. This would be also Gordon's last win until late October.
This was the fourth straight year in which Jeff Gordon would win the Southern 500. Not only is Jeff Gordon the only driver in NASCAR history to win 4 straight Southern 500 races, but he also the only driver in NASCAR history to win 4 straight races in one NASCAR Crown Jewel event. The 5 crown jewel events are Daytona 500, World 600, Brickyard 400, Southern 500, and Winston 500. His future teammate Jimmie Johnson however, would almost accomplish that feat in the Coca-Cola 600 at Charlotte. He would win 3 straight in 2003, 2004, and 2005. He would come so close on winning 4 straight Coca-Cola 600 races in 2006, but he would finish 2nd to another future teammate, Kasey Kahne.
This was the 3rd consecutive year that Jeff Gordon won 10+ races in a season, a NASCAR modern era record. Gordon passed Darrell Waltrip for this feat after Darrell won 12 races each in back to back seasons of 1981 and 1982. Richard Petty holds the record for scoring 10 or more wins in 5 consecutive seasons. He scored 27 wins in 1967, 16 wins in 1968, 10 wins in 1969, 18 wins in 1970, & 21 wins in 1971, scoring a combined total of 92 wins.
This would be the last time until Gordon's future teammate Jimmie Johnson in 2007 that a driver would win 10 races in a season. After Johnson in 2007, it would not be done again until Kyle Larson in 2021 won 10 races en route to his First Championship.

Exide NASCAR Select Batteries 400 

The Exide NASCAR Select Batteries 400 was run on September 12 in Richmond, Virginia. Rusty Wallace won the pole. The race was broadcast on ESPN. Jeff Burton would edge Jeff Gordon in an exciting side by side finish to take the win.

Top Ten Results

 99-Jeff Burton
 24-Jeff Gordon
  6-Mark Martin
 33-Ken Schrader
 43-John Andretti
  4-Bobby Hamilton
  2-Rusty Wallace
 31-Mike Skinner
 23-Jimmy Spencer
 28-Kenny Irwin Jr.

Failed to qualify: 00-Buckshot Jones, 78-Gary Bradberry, 79-Ken Bouchard, 98-Rich Bickle
Robert Pressley suffered a broken scapula in a crash early on, and would be forced to sit out the next two races.

MBNA Gold 400 

The MBNA Gold 400 was run on September 20 in Dover, Delaware. Mark Martin won the pole. The race was broadcast on TNN.

Top Ten Results

  6-Mark Martin
 24-Jeff Gordon
 12-Jeremy Mayfield
 18-Bobby Labonte
  2-Rusty Wallace
 94-Matt Kenseth*
 88-Dale Jarrett
 28-Ernie Irvan
 43-John Andretti
  4-Bobby Hamilton 1 lap down

Failed to qualify: 41-Steve Grissom, 71-Dave Marcis, 96-Morgan Shepherd

Matt Kenseth made his Winston Cup debut in relief of Bill Elliott.  Elliott decided to skip the race to mourn the death of his father, George.
Matt Kenseth became the 3rd highest finisher in his Winston Cup debut, finishing 6th. Only 2 drivers have finished in the top 5 in their Cup Series debuts, and that was Terry Labonte, who finished 4th in the 1978 Southern 500 at Darlington, and Rusty Wallace, who finished 2nd in the fall Atlanta race in 1980. 
Dale Earnhardt and Terry Labonte both made their 600th career Winston Cup starts in this race.

NAPA Autocare 500 

The NAPA Autocare 500 was run on September 27 in Martinsville, Virginia. Ernie Irvan won the pole. The race was broadcast on ESPN.

Top Ten Results

 10-Ricky Rudd*
 24-Jeff Gordon
  6-Mark Martin
 98-Rich Bickle*
 99-Jeff Burton
  5-Terry Labonte
 94-Bill Elliott
 36-Ernie Irvan 1 lap down
 26-Johnny Benson 1 lap down
 18-Bobby Labonte 1 lap down

Failed to qualify: 41-David Green, 78-Gary Bradberry, 79-Ken Bouchard, 85-Randy MacDonald

 This race was run in oppressive heat and humidity.  Multiple drivers required relief during the event.  Jerry Nadeau was actually forced to pull off the track at one point because he needed relief, and there was no one available that could relieve him.
 Ricky Rudd's cooler box broke literally on lap one of the race.  This resulted in Rudd being broiled inside of the car.  Hut Stricklin was on standby to relieve Rudd, but Rudd never got out of the car.  In Victory Lane, Rudd had to be pulled out of the car and given first aid by paramedics.  Dr. Jerry Punch, who conducted the Victory Lane interview, helped out the paramedics.
20th career win for Ricky Rudd. With this win, Ricky Rudd's winning streak would stay alive, making this the 16th straight season that he has won at least one race, 3rd all-time. Richard Petty leads the category by winning at least one race in 18 straight seasons (1960-1977, 185 wins), the most in NASCAR history. This would be Rudd's last win until Pocono in June 2001,  years and 89 races later.
This was the final victory for Cup Series team Rudd Performance Motorsports.
This was Rich Bickle's best career finish.  Bickle broke down in tears during a post-race interview on ESPN.
Last career pole for Ernie Irvan.

UAW-GM Quality 500 

The UAW-GM Quality 500 was run on October 4 in Concord, North Carolina.  The No. 30 of Derrike Cope won the pole. The race was broadcast on TBS.

Top Ten Results

  6-Mark Martin
 22-Ward Burton
 99-Jeff Burton
  4-Bobby Hamilton
 24-Jeff Gordon
 16-Kevin Lepage
 42-Joe Nemechek
 97-Chad Little
  7-Geoff Bodine
 23-Jimmy Spencer

Failed to qualify: 19-Tony Raines, 46-Jeff Green, 71-Dave Marcis, 80-Andy Hillenburg, 85-Randy MacDonald

 This race was red-flagged for nearly 2 hours due to a sewer main behind the backstretch breaking.  As a result, raw sewage water streamed across the backstretch from underneath the outside wall.

Winston 500 

The Winston 500 was run on October 11 in Talladega, Alabama. Ken Schrader won the pole. The race was broadcast on ESPN.

Top Ten Results

 88-Dale Jarrett
 24-Jeff Gordon
  5-Terry Labonte
 23-Jimmy Spencer
 12-Jeremy Mayfield
 18-Bobby Labonte
 31-Mike Skinner
 97-Chad Little
 21-Michael Waltrip
 99-Jeff Burton

Failed to qualify: 07-Dan Pardus, 41-Rick Wilson, 54-Bobby Gerhart, 75-Rick Mast, 78-Gary Bradberry, 98-Rich Bickle

 Winston No Bull 5 race: Dale Jarrett won an extra million dollars because he won this race and finished in the top 5 in the Southern 500.
 Ernie Irvan was injured in a crash on lap 135 when he spun and hit the wall.  The No. 90 of Dick Trickle hit Irvan's No. 36 when it came back across the track.  Irvan started the race at Daytona for points, but then sat out the remaining 3 races.

Pepsi 400 

The Pepsi 400 was scheduled to run on July 4 in Daytona Beach, Florida, but was run on October 17 due to wildfires in the Daytona Beach area.  Bobby Labonte sat on the Bud Pole.  The race was broadcast on TNN.

Top Ten Results

 24-Jeff Gordon
 18-Bobby Labonte
 31-Mike Skinner
 12-Jeremy Mayfield
  2-Rusty Wallace
  5-Terry Labonte
 22-Ward Burton
 36-Ernie Irvan / Ricky Craven*
 33-Ken Schrader
  3-Dale Earnhardt

Failed to qualify: 41-Rick Wilson, 75-Rick Mast, 77-Robert Pressley, 78-Gary Bradberry, 90-Dick Trickle

This was the first NASCAR race at Daytona to be run under the lights.
1998 was the first, and to date, only NASCAR season to have back-to-back points paying restrictor plate races, with the Pepsi 400 being run after the Winston 500.
This race was originally scheduled to be broadcast by CBS, but TNN broadcast the race due to prior commitments by CBS (due to the race's rescheduling).
Ernie Irvan started the race in the No. 36, but was replaced at the first caution by Ricky Craven.
This was Jeff Gordon's 40th Winston Cup Career win.
The 11th win of 1998 for Jeff Gordon. This was the first time since Dale Earnhardt in 1987 that a driver won 11 races in a season.
As of 2020, this is the last time that a driver won 11 races in a season.
This race was Dan Pardus' only career Cup Series start.

Dura Lube/Kmart 500 

The Dura Lube/Kmart 500* was run on October 25 in Phoenix, Arizona. The No. 33 of Ken Schrader won the pole. The race was broadcast on TNN.

Top Ten Results

  2-Rusty Wallace
  6-Mark Martin
  3-Dale Earnhardt
 99-Jeff Burton
 13-Ted Musgrave
 43-John Andretti
 24-Jeff Gordon
 81-Kenny Wallace
 26-Johnny Benson
  5-Terry Labonte

Failed to qualify:  21-Michael Waltrip, 45-Jeff Ward, 71-Dave Marcis

 This race was shortened to 257 laps due to rain.
 This race ended a string of 17 straight top 5 finishes for Jeff Gordon, which is a NASCAR record.

AC Delco 400 

The AC Delco 400 was run on November 1 in Rockingham, North Carolina. Mark Martin won the pole. The race was broadcast on TNN.

Top Ten Results

 24-Jeff Gordon
 88-Dale Jarrett
  2-Rusty Wallace
  6-Mark Martin
 99-Jeff Burton
  4-Bobby Hamilton
 22-Ward Burton
  5-Terry Labonte
  3-Dale Earnhardt
 10-Ricky Rudd

Failed to qualify: 71-Dave Marcis, 80-Andy Hillenburg, 96-Steve Grissom

 Jeff Gordon clinched the 1998 Winston Cup Series championship by finishing 40th or better.
The 12th win of 1998 for Jeff Gordon. This was the first time since Darrell Waltrip in 1982 that a driver won 12 races in a season.

NAPA 500 

The NAPA 500 was run on November 8 in Hampton, Georgia. Kenny Irwin Jr. won his 1st career pole. Twice during the race, the red flag was displayed, both times for rain. By the time the race was again red-flagged, midnight was approaching, and track officials felt obliged to get the fans home at a decent hour. So the race was called at 221 of the scheduled 325 laps. The race was broadcast on ESPN.

Top Ten Results

 24-Jeff Gordon
 88-Dale Jarrett
  6-Mark Martin
 99-Jeff Burton
 91-Todd Bodine*
  4-Bobby Hamilton
 33-Ken Schrader
  5-Terry Labonte
 31-Mike Skinner
  7-Geoff Bodine

Failed to qualify: 08-Harris DeVane, 75-Rick Mast, 80-Andy Hillenburg, 96-Steve Grissom,
98-Rich Bickle

 Todd Bodine's fifth-place finish was the best ever finish for LJ Racing in the Cup Series.
 Jeff Gordon's win made him the second driver after Bobby Labonte to win on both of the configurations at Atlanta, after winning only one race on the 1.522 miles when he won in the spring of 1995.
 Jeff Gordon's win ensured Chevrolet the 1998 Manufacturers' Championship.
The 13th win of 1998 for Jeff Gordon. With this win, Jeff Gordon ties a NASCAR modern-era record with Richard Petty for the most wins in a single season. This feat was accomplished first by Petty in 1975. As of 2021, this is the second and last time that a driver won 13 races in a season. Also, as of 2021, Jeff Gordon is the last driver to win more than 10 races in a single season.
With 13 wins, 26 top 5s, and 28 top 10s, including the 17 straight top 5 finishes and 20 straight top 10 finishes, Jeff Gordon scored a total of 5,328 points in 33 races of 1998. This would be the most points scored in Bob Latford Winston Cup points system history.
Mark Martin finishes second in points for the third time in his career, and with that, he would tie James Hylton for the most runner-up finishes for a driver to never win a championship.
This was the 20th consecutive race that Jeff Gordon would finish in the top 10, a NASCAR record.
Last points race without Tony Stewart on the grid until the 2013 Cheez-It 355 at The Glen.

NASCAR Thunder Special Motegi - Coca-Cola 500 

The NASCAR Thunder Special Motegi - Coca-Cola 500 was an exhibition race run on November 22 at the Twin Ring Motegi oval in Motegi, Tochigi, Japan. Jeremy Mayfield won the pole.

This is also the first NASCAR race where Dale Earnhardt and Dale Earnhardt Jr. competed with one another in the No. 3 and No. 1 Chevrolets respectively. The race was broadcast on TBS.

Top Ten Results

 31-Mike Skinner
 24-Jeff Gordon
 12-Jeremy Mayfield
 99-Jeff Burton
  2-Rusty Wallace
  1-Dale Earnhardt Jr.
 94-Bill Elliott
  3-Dale Earnhardt
 40-Sterling Marlin
 21-Michael Waltrip 2 laps down

Failed to qualify:  None

 Dale Jarrett was forced to skip the event due to gallbladder surgery that needed to be performed immediately after the NAPA 500 so that he would be ready for Daytona in February.  Darrell Waltrip drove the No. 88 in Jarrett's place.

Final points standings

(key) Bold - Pole position awarded by time. Italics - Pole position set by owner's points standings. * – Most laps led.

Rookie of the Year

This would be the last time until 2004 in which a rookie candidate did not win a race. The winner of this year's award was Kenny Irwin Jr., who qualified for 32 of the 33 races, had four top-tens, and one pole position in his Robert Yates Racing Ford. Kevin Lepage finished in second-place despite missing six races and starting the year with an underfunded team. Third-place finisher Jerry Nadeau also switched teams, starting the year with Bill Elliott Racing but winding up at Melling Racing at season's end. Finally, the last-place finisher was pre-season favorite Steve Park, who missed most of the year after suffering a broken leg in a practice crash at Atlanta Motor Speedway.

See also
1998 NASCAR Busch Series
1998 NASCAR Craftsman Truck Series

Sources
Racing Reference 
TV schedule provided by
 Race2Win
 The Auto Channel

References

 
NASCAR Cup Series seasons